Alarm in the Mountains (Romanian: Alarmă în munți) is a 1955 Romanian action film directed by Dinu Negreanu. In the Romanian countryside, the poor are threatened by bandits organised by the former owners of the lands who have been dispossessed by the communists. In a mountainous area, border guards are confronted by parachuted spies who want to recover and take over the border several secret documents of a forestry plant.

Cast
 Mircea Albulescu 
 Ion Anghel 
 Romulus Bărbulescu as a spy
  as Lupan
 Liviu Ciulei as a spy
  as Codița
 Iurie Darie as Grigore
 Fory Etterle as Stavrescu
 
  as Bordea
  as Mitru
 Ion Lucian as Pavel
 
 Amza Pellea
  as Mihai Durau
  as Păruș Vasile
 Aurelia Sorescu as Elena

Welcoming 
4,022,943 viewers watched the movie in the Romania's cinemas, as evidenced by a situation of the number of viewers recorded at the Romanian movies from the premiere date by December 31, 2014, made by the National Center of Cinematography.

References

Bibliography 
 Liehm, Mira & Liehm, Antonín J. The Most Important Art: Eastern European Film After 1945. University of California Press, 1977.

External links 
 

1955 films
1950s action films
Romanian action films
1950s Romanian-language films
Films directed by Dinu Negreanu
Romanian black-and-white films